On Trial is a 1917 silent American drama film directed by James Young and starring Barbara Castleton. It was produced by Essanay Film Manufacturing Company and distributed through First National Exhibitors (later First National Pictures) as its first feature film.

Cast
Barbara Castleton as Mrs. Robert Strickland
Sidney Ainsworth as Robert Strickland
Mary McAllister as Doris Strickland
James Young as Gerald Trask
Corene Uzzell as Mrs. Gerald Trask
Patrick Calhoun as Glover
John Cossar 
Richard Foster Baker as The Judge
Harry Dunkinson as Attorney for the Defense
Marian Skinner as Strickland Family Housekeeper
Robert Bolder as Mr. Burke
Thomas Commerford as Hotel Owner
Frank Hamilton as Court Clerk
Doris Kenyon (uncredited)

Preservation status
A print of On Trial is preserved in the George Eastman House Motion Picture Collection.

References

External links

Lantern slide (State University of New York; SUNY)

1917 films
American silent feature films
American black-and-white films
Films directed by James Young
Essanay Studios films
Silent American drama films
1917 drama films
1910s American films